The 1992 Oklahoma Sooners football team represented the University of Oklahoma during the 1992 NCAA Division I-A football season. They played their home games at Oklahoma Memorial Stadium and competed as members of the Big Eight Conference. They were coached by fourth-year head coach Gary Gibbs.

Schedule

Roster

Rankings

Season summary

Texas

Postseason

NFL draft
The following players were drafted into the National Football League following the season.

References

Oklahoma
Oklahoma Sooners football seasons
Oklahoma Sooners football